Information Received is a 1961 British crime film directed by Robert Lynn and starring Sabine Sesselmann, William Sylvester and Hermione Baddeley. In the film, a police detective goes undercover to infiltrate a safe-breaking outfit.

Cast
 Sabine Sesselmann - Sabina Farlow
 William Sylvester - Rick Hogan
 Hermione Baddeley - Maudie
 Edward Underdown - Drake
 Robert Raglan - Supt. Jeffcote
 Frank Hawkins - Sgt. Jarvie
 Walter Brown - Vic Farlow
 David Courtney - Mark
 Peter Allenby - Patterson
 Bill Dancy - Johnny Stevens
 Dan Meaden - Country Policeman
 Ted Bushell - Prison Trustee
 Tim Brinton - TV announcer
 Johnny Briggs - Willis
 David Cargill - Librarian
 Larry Taylor - Darnell
 Douglas Cameron - Warder Benham
 David Ensor - Judge
 Tony Shepherd - Squad Car Policeman

Critical reception
TV Guide gave the film 2 out of 4 stars, and wrote, "the film is stylish and witty at times, but its pace just isn't as fast as it should be."

References

External links

1961 films
British crime drama films
1961 crime films
1960s English-language films
Films directed by Robert Lynn
Police detective films
Films with screenplays by Berkely Mather
1960s British films